The  is a bureau of the Tokyo Metropolitan Police Department (TMPD) in charge of public security with jurisdiction over the Tokyo metropolis. It has a force of more than 2,000 officers. The bureau reports to the Deputy Superintendent General.

In the Japanese police organization, only the Metropolitan Police Department becomes "the bureau" where the security police branch becomes independent. In other prefectural police forces, the Public Security Section and Foreign Affairs Division are installed in a Security Department. Tokyo is seen as an exception since it had been working with the Japanese National Police Agency for the longest time since they share the same location.

The PSB is not the Japanese equivalent of the U.S. Federal Bureau of Investigation, despite some claims that it is. It does not concern with ordinary criminal activities. The main focus of the PSB are activities which threaten national security and therefore, their work is similar to Special Branches of British and Commonwealth police forces.

History
The establishment of the PSB started on December 19, 1945 when the Security Division was established in the Tokyo Metropolitan Police. On February 1946, the SD was changed to the Public Security Division. In April 1952, the PSD's first and second security departments were established with the former taking charge of the TMPD's riot police units while the latter carried out security information operations. In April 1957, the TMPD's ecurity Department 1, Security Department 2, and Metropolitan Police Department Reserve were renamed as the Security Department, the Public Security Department and the Riot Police.

The PSB had been mobilized to investigate all Aum Shinrikyo facilities after the deadly sarin gas attack on the Tokyo subway. Following the discovery of an Aum cultist who had been employed by the Japan Maritime Self-Defense Force after sensitive military information had been leaked out, the PSB had investigated the matter. The PSB had been the leading agency to investigate reports that Aum Shinrikyo had acquired names of 3,000 Honda executives and sensitive data from government ministries and other important facilities via Aum-created software.

The TMPD announced on November 2, 2020 that the foreign affairs division will be revamped to have two separate units to deal with intelligence matters concerning China and North Korea, giving it a total of four separate units.

On December 25, 2022, the PSB produced a promotional video and starred Rena Nōnen aka Non on the dangers of foreign-backed corporate espionage.

Cases
The PSB had failed in securing a Russian man wanted for spying in Japanese territory as a suspected agent of the SVR since the 1960s when he left Japan in 1995 and reentered the country several times before being unaccounted for when the spy used a Japanese name to obtain a Japanese passport in Vienna.

An ex-Japanese Air Self-Defense Forces warrant officer had been investigated by the PSB in 2002 for divulging military secrets under the Mutual Defense Assistance Agreement to a Russian GRU operative, who was identified as Aleksei Shchelkonogov. Three activists of the Tachikawa Jieitai Kanshi Tentomura had been said to be prisoners of conscience by Amnesty International when they had arrested by police with the PSB investigating them for conducting anti-war activities after illegally entering an SDF housing complex in Tachikawa in 2004.

On December 15, 2020, PSB officers investigated the activities of a South Korean man living in Tokyo accused of hacking into the Chongryon website and the Korea News Service.

Scandals
After a discovery of sophisticated radios by police during a raid on a JRCL Revolutionary Marxist Faction safehouse on April 10, 1998, PSB officials had reorganized their communications network to better safeguard it against unwanted intrusions.

In 2014, a report was made thanks to a leak that PSB officers were conducting covert surveillance activities on Muslims residents living in the Greater Tokyo Area.

Organization
In the Bureau, there are divisions and units as below:

 
 In addition to four deputy managers mandated for indoor service (and ), there are eight deputy managers mandated for public security investigation. The Fifth and Sixth Deputy Manager of Public Security Investigation are mandated for counter-terrorism investigations, and from the First to Fourth are mandated for others.
 
 There are four deputy managers and eight units, all are mandated for public security investigation against left-wing rebel groups.
 
 There are three deputy managers and seven units, mainly mandated for public security investigation against left-wing groups and labor unrest.
 
 There are five deputy managers and nine units, all are mandated for public security investigation against right-wing groups.
 
 There are two deputy managers and units, mandated for public security investigation affairs assigned specially.
 
 There are three deputy managers and five units, mainly mandated for public security investigation and counterintelligence affairs related to Europe.
 
 There are two deputy managers and five units, mandated for public security investigation and counterintelligence affairs related to Asia.
 
 There are two deputy managers and four units, mandated for public security investigation and counterintelligence affairs related to North East Asia.
 
 There are four deputy managers and six units, mandated for public security investigation and counterintelligence affairs related to international terrorism.
 
 Mandated for initial investigation under PSB's jurisdiction including criminal/espionage/terrorist cases. Also has an NBC Terrorist Investigation Unit.

Training
Prospective PSB officers are trained at the National Police Academy in intelligence gathering techniques.

Known heads of PSB
 Shigeo Ito
 Masuo Okamura
 Norikiyo Hayashi

References

Bibliography

External links
 To Protect Peace and Freedom of the Democracy (Metropolitan Police Department  Official Website) 

Japanese intelligence agencies
Police units of the Tokyo Metropolitan Police Department